Oliver Spasovski (born 21 October 1976) is a Macedonian politician who is the current Minister of Internal Affairs since 30 August 2020 and previously from November 2015 to May 2016, September to December 2016 and May 2017 to January 2020. He is the general secretary of the Social Democratic Union of Macedonia (SDSM). He served as Prime Minister of North Macedonia from 3 January 2020 to 30 August 2020, following an agreement between the leaders of SDSM and VMRO-DPMNE, Zoran Zaev and Hristijan Mickoski, to hold early parliamentary elections on 12 April 2020, which was rescheduled to 15 July 2020.

References

|-

|-

|-

|-

1976 births
Eastern Orthodox Christians from North Macedonia
Living people
Members of the Macedonian Orthodox Church
People from Kumanovo
Internal affairs ministers of North Macedonia
Prime Ministers of North Macedonia
Social Democratic Union of Macedonia politicians